Donakonda Airport  is located at Donakonda in the Prakasam district of Andhra Pradesh, India. It was constructed during the Second World War by the British to refuel its aircraft. It is owned by the Airports Authority of India and is closed.

Airlines and destinations 
There are no scheduled commercial air services.

References

External links

 Donakonda Airport at the Airports Authority of India
 VODK at Great Circle Airports

Defunct airports in India
Airports in Andhra Pradesh
Buildings and structures in Prakasam district
Transport in Prakasam district
1940s establishments in India
Airports established in the 1940s
20th-century architecture in India